Warren Stone may refer to:
Warren Stone (musician)
Warren Stanford Stone (1 February 1860 - 12 June 1925), a railway engineer who headed the Brotherhood of Locomotive Engineers from 1903 to 1925.
SS Warren Stone, a liberty ship

See also
Charles Warren Stone